Czech Mexicans are citizens of Mexico who are of Czech descent. Czechs originate from the Czech lands, a term which refers to the majority of the traditional lands of the Bohemian Crown, namely Bohemia, Moravia and Czech Silesia. These lands of have been governed by a variety of states, including the Kingdom of Bohemia, a crown land of the Austrian Empire, the Czechoslovak Republic, and, now, the Czech Republic.

History

Jesuit missionaries
During the colonial era, there were several Bohemian Jesuit missionaries involved in the evangelization of Mexico. The first Jesuits left Bohemia for the Americas in 1678. A notable example is Simon Boruhradsky (Hispanicized as Simón de Castro) who was part of the Viceroy's court and contributed to architectural projects.

Recent immigration
The Czech community in Mexico has been a discrete community, most of them arrived to the country as refugees escaping from World Wars. The Czech community of Mexico City frequently meets for celebrations at the statue of Tomáš Garrigue Masaryk located on Avenida Presidente Masaryk.

Notable individuals
 Angélica Espinoza Stransky, actress
 Juan de Esteyneffer, Jesuit missionary 
 Wenceslaus Linck, Jesuit missionary
 Rubén Marshall Tikalova, editorial director 
 Miroslava, actress of the Golden Age of Mexican cinema
 Sylvia Schmelkes, sociologist
 Sasha Sokol, actress and singer

See also
 Czech Republic–Mexico relations
 Norteño (music), influenced by Central European immigrants

References

Further reading
 Odložilík, Otakar "Czech Missionaries in New Spain", The Hispanic American Historical Review, Vol. 25, No. 4 (Nov., 1945), pp. 428-454
 Polzer, Charles W. (1991). The Jesuit Missions of Northern Mexico. Taylor & Francis. .
 Rechcigl, Miloslav (2016). Encyclopedia of Bohemian and Czech-American Biography . AuthorHouse.  (includes biographies of Bohemian missionaries active in colonial Mexico)

Immigration to Mexico
 
 
Mexico
Ethnic groups in Mexico